Thomas Nevers is a retired American soccer player who played professionally in the North American Soccer League and Major Indoor Soccer League.

Youth
Nevers graduated from E. O. Smith High School in 1974 where he was a four sport letterman (soccer, baseball, golf and track).  He led his high school team to the 1972 state championship and was an NSCAA High School All American.  He is a member of the E.O. Smith High School Athletic Hall of Fame.  He is also a member of the Connecticut Soccer Hall of Fame in 2007.  He then attended the University of Connecticut where he played on the men's soccer team from 1974 to 1977.

Professional
Nevers turned professional in 1978 with the Chicago Sting of the North American Soccer League.  In 1979, he moved to the Memphis Rogues where he played two outdoor seasons.  In the fall of 1979, he began his indoor career with the Memphis Rogues of the indoor North American Soccer League.  After one season, he transferred to the Hartford Hellions before finishing his career with the Memphis Americans during the 1981-1982 MISL season.

References

External links
NASL/MISL stats

1956 births
Living people
Sportspeople from Middletown, Connecticut
Soccer players from Connecticut
American soccer players
Chicago Sting (NASL) players
Hartford Hellions players
Major Indoor Soccer League (1978–1992) players
Memphis Americans players
Memphis Rogues players
North American Soccer League (1968–1984) players
UConn Huskies men's soccer players
Association football forwards
Association football defenders